El Triunfo Airport  is an airstrip by the Yacuma River in the pampa of the Beni Department in Bolivia. The nearest town is Santa Ana del Yacuma,  to the east.

See also

Transport in Bolivia
List of airports in Bolivia

References

External links 
OpenStreetMap - El Triunfo
OurAirports - El Triunfo
Fallingrain - El Triunfo Airport

Airports in Beni Department